Orinoco Faamausili-Banse-Prince (born 31 July 1990 in Auckland) is a New Zealand swimmer of Samoan heritage, who specialized in freestyle events. He represented New Zealand at the 2008 Summer Olympics in Beijing, and competed as part of the men's national swimming team for the men's 4 × 100 m freestyle relay. Faamausili-Banse joined the team, along with compatriots Cameron Gibson, Mark Herring, and Willy Benson, and swam in the final leg of the competition, with an individual split time of 48.96 seconds. He and his swimming team placed sixth in the first heat, and eleventh overall, for a total time of 3:15.41.

Faamausili-Banse also won a gold medal, and set a national record for the 50 m freestyle, with a time of 22.37 seconds, at the 2008 FINA Youth World Swimming Championships in Monterrey, Mexico.

References

External links
NBC Olympics Profile

Profile – Magic Swimming Academy

Living people
Olympic swimmers of New Zealand
Swimmers at the 2008 Summer Olympics
Swimmers from Auckland
New Zealand male freestyle swimmers
1990 births
New Zealand Māori sportspeople
New Zealand sportspeople of Samoan descent
21st-century New Zealand people